Laccaria ochropurpurea is an edible mushroom found under hardwood and conifers east of the Rocky Mountains.

References

External links 

ochropurpurea
Fungi of North America